Arta bichordalis is a species of snout moth in the genus Arta. It was described by Émile Louis Ragonot, in 1891, and is known from Brazil.

References

Chrysauginae
Moths of South America
Pyralidae of South America
Moths described in 1891